The Montana State Capitol is the state capitol of the U.S. state of Montana that houses the Montana State Legislature which is located in the state capital of Helena at 1301 East Sixth Avenue. The building was constructed between 1896 and 1902 with wing-annexes added between 1909 and 1912.

History

A design competition for the building was conducted in 1896. The commission selected a design by George R. Mann as the winner. In 1897, after it was found that the Commission was planning to scam money from the building project, it was disbanded and a second Capitol Commission was convened. The new Commission abandoned Mann's plan as being too costly, and had a second design competition, won by Charles Emlen Bell and John Hackett Kent, of Bell & Kent of Council Bluffs, Iowa. In order to have their design built, Bell & Kent relocated their office to Helena.

While Mann's building was never built in Montana, it was selected later as the basic design for the Arkansas State Capitol.

The winning design by Bell & Kent had been altered already during the construction phase, when in 1901 the commission asked for the structure to be made more imposing by increasing the height of the dome. Kent opposed the changes, as his original low spherical dome was meant to be "pure Greek", but Bell advocated the commission's request.

Between 1909 and 1912, the building was extended by the addition of two new wings on the eastern and western sides. This work was executed by Link & Haire, architects of Butte, with F. M. Andrews & Company of New York as consulting architects.

Architecture 
The building, constructed of Montana sandstone and granite, is in Greek neoclassical architectural style, and is listed on the National Register of Historic Places. The exterior of the dome is covered with copper. Atop the dome is a feminine statue affectionately dubbed Montana.

The Montana statue, formerly known as Lady Liberty sits atop the Capitol dome.

Art 

The most notable feature inside the center of the Capitol building is the massive rotunda, with four circular paintings surrounding it. These paintings, painted for the Capitol opening in 1902 by the firm of F. Pedretti's Sons, depict four important archetypes of people of Montana's early history: a Native American (intended to be of Chief Charlo), an explorer and fur trapper (Jim Bridger), a gold miner (Henry Finnis Edgar, one of the discoverers of gold at Alder Gulch), and a cowboy (unidentified, but said to be inspired by the works of C.M. Russell).  The Pendretti brothers provided additional commissioned artwork in the Senate and Old Supreme Court Chambers.

The southern arch of the rotunda features the semi-elliptical painting Driving The Golden Spike, painted by Amédée Joullin. The former State Law Library, now a set of committee rooms, features ten Montana landscapes created by Ralph E. DeCamp. The House of Representatives Lobby features six scenes depicting significant events in early Montana History by Edgar S. Paxson.

The most significant piece of art in the Capitol is by Montana's famous Western artist Charles M. Russell. It depicts the explorers Lewis and Clark meeting Montana's Bitterroot Salish people upon their return across the Bitterroot Mountains from the Pacific Ocean. It is now displayed above the Speaker's chair in the House of Representatives' chamber.

See also
Yule marble
List of state and territorial capitols in the United States

References

External links 

 Historic images of the Montana State Capitol
 Visiting information and history 

Government buildings on the National Register of Historic Places in Montana
Government of Montana
State capitols in the United States
Government buildings with domes
Tourist attractions in Helena, Montana
1902 establishments in Montana
National Register of Historic Places in Helena, Montana
Renaissance Revival architecture in Montana